The Scottish Ten was a five-year project, initiated in 2009, funded by the Scottish Government. It used technology to create accurate digital models of the country's five World Heritage Sites and five other UNESCO World Heritage Sites elsewhere in the world.

History
The Scottish Ten was initiated by the Minister for Culture, External Affairs and the Constitution Michael Russell in early 2009, at the Glasgow School of Art’s Digital Documentation conference. The minister had heard Ben Kacyra, father of the laser scanner and founder of CyArk, speak about his mission to digitally document the 500 most at risk heritage sites across the world over the next five years. The minister found inspiration in this project and discussion began as to how Scotland could be involved. The Scottish Ten was formally announced at the Mount Rushmore National Memorial on 4 July 2009.

About the Scottish Ten
The Scottish Ten project's primary aims were to:
 Record important historical sites for the benefit of future generations in Scotland and overseas
 Share and disseminate Scottish technical expertise and foster international collaboration
 Provide digital media to site managers to better care for the heritage resource
 Recognise international Scottish cultural connections

Led by Historic Scotland and its partner Glasgow School of Art, under their collaborative venture The Centre for Digital Documentation and Visualisation LLP, the Scottish Ten project created digital documentation of the sites for future development of world class and innovative research, education and management.

The project scanned the five UNESCO World Heritage Sites in Scotland. The overseas sites were selected to fulfil Scottish Government International objectives in Australia, China, India, Japan and the United States.

The 18th century cotton-manufacturing settlement at New Lanark was the first Scottish site to be scanned. Mount Rushmore in South Dakota, in the United States, was scanned in August 2009.

The project used highly precise, high speed terrestrial laser scanning systems, some capable of sub-millimetre data capture and aerial optical remote sensing technology called LIDAR (Light Detection And Ranging).

When the digital models were complete, they were hosted by CyArk, a non-profit organisation set up to digitally record heritage sites across the globe and provide public access to the information.

Sites

The five Scottish UNESCO World Heritage Sites are:
 Antonine Wall
 Edinburgh
 Neolithic Orkney
 New Lanark
 St. Kilda

The five non-Scottish UNESCO World Heritage Sites are:
 Eastern Qing Tombs (China)
 Giant Cantilever Crane at Nagasaki (Japan)
 Mount Rushmore (USA)
 Rani ki vav (India)
 Sydney Opera House (Australia)

References

External links
 
 Gsa.ac.uk/dds
 CyArk website

2009 establishments in Scotland
Organisations supported by the Scottish Government